Gurusuty is a small village in Pithoragarh, Uttarakhand, India. This village was established before more than 300 years by Upadhyayas, but nowadays nobody is there in this village.

Villages in Pithoragarh district